Kaarthika is an Indian children show that aired on Hungama TV from 27 September 2004 to 23 December 2004 and was  later syndicated on Disney Channel India from 2008 to 2009. It was produced by Balaji Telefilms.

Plot

Kartika is a nice singer and dreams of being a star. She asks her father and mother to get her admitted her in the singing academy. At first, they don't agree, but she handles all. At the academy, she makes new friends and rivals. She shares her room with Ankana, a bad but popular girl who always insults her and gets her into trouble.

Cast

Main
 Jennifer Winget as Kartika
 Aditya Vaidya as Ritwik
 Ankana Mehra as Bonita
 Abhay Vakil as Abhishek
 Arjun Bijlani as Ankush

Recurring
 Monica Kale as Meenakshi
 Swati as Ash
 Shikha as Sush
 Mitika as Sweta
 Resham Tipnis as Sushma
 Sanjeev Seth
 Aarti as Brinda
 Monica Kale as Tanya
 Daljeet Kaur

References 

Balaji Telefilms television series
Indian children's television series
Indian comedy television series
2004 Indian television series debuts
2004 Indian television series endings
Indian teen drama television series
Hungama TV original programming